Mount Campleman is a flat-topped, projecting-type mountain in Antarctica,  high, along the north edge of Mackin Table,  west of Stout Spur, in the Patuxent Range, Pensacola Mountains. It was mapped by the United States Geological Survey from surveys and from U.S. Navy air photos, 1956–66, and named by the Advisory Committee on Antarctic Names for Richard Campleman of the U.S. Navy, the Petty Officer in charge of Palmer Station during the winter of 1967.

References 

Mountains of Queen Elizabeth Land
Pensacola Mountains